Thomas Guerbert (born 6 April 1989) is a French former footballer who played as a midfielder.

Club career

Luzenac
Guerbert played with US Luzenac for two years, in which he amassed over 60 appearances. In his final season with Luzenac in the Championnat National, the third level of French football, Guerbert was named the league's Player of the Year by news publication France Football.

Dijon
After signing with Dijon FCO, he made his professional debut on 31 August 2011 in a Coupe de la Ligue match against Valenciennes. In the contest, Guerbert scored the game-winning goal in a 3–2 win.

Sochaux
In September 2013, Guerbert joined FC Sochaux-Montbéliard from Dijon for an undisclosed fee.

On 2 November 2013, Guerbert suffered a double leg break and a dislocated ankle, as a result of a tackle from Saint-Étienne defender Kurt Zouma. which ruled him out for the rest of the season.

Clermont Foot
In late June 2016, Guerbert joined Clermont Foot.

Personal life
Guerbert is the older brother of the footballer Matthieu Guerbert.

References

External links
 
 

Living people
1989 births
People from Meaux
Footballers from Seine-et-Marne
French footballers
Association football midfielders
Luzenac AP players
Dijon FCO players
FC Sochaux-Montbéliard players
Clermont Foot players
Ligue 1 players
Ligue 2 players
Championnat National players